The 1987–88 NBA season was the 42nd season of the National Basketball Association. The season ended with the Los Angeles Lakers winning their second straight Championship, beating the Detroit Pistons in seven hard-fought games in the NBA Finals, becoming the NBA's first repeat champions since the Boston Celtics did it in the 1968–69 NBA season.

Notable occurrences

The 1988 NBA All-Star Game was played at Chicago Stadium in Chicago, with the East defeating the West 138–133. Local hero Michael Jordan steals the show during the weekend, taking home the game's MVP award, after winning the slam dunk contest earlier in the week over runner-up Dominique Wilkins.
Michael Jordan becomes the only player in NBA history to win both the scoring title and Defensive Player of the Year honors. He is also the only player in NBA history to combine these awards with the season's Most Valuable Player award.
Michael Jordan becomes the only player in NBA history to accumulate over 200 steals with over 100 blocks in a season twice, and in a row.
James Worthy records the first ever Game Seven triple double as he records 36 points, 16 rebounds, and 10 assists.
The league awards expansion franchises to Charlotte, Miami, Minneapolis, and Orlando. The Charlotte and Miami  franchises would debut in the 1988–89 NBA season, while Minneapolis and Orlando would begin play in the 1989–90 NBA season.
The New Jersey Nets had 3 different head coaches during the season, a rare occurrence.  The Indiana Pacers had four different head coaches during the following season.
The San Antonio Spurs are the last team in NBA history to lose 50 or more games in a season, and still make the playoffs. Although they drafted center David Robinson with the No. 1 overall pick the previous year, he does not join the team until the 1989–90 season, due to a two-year commitment to the United States Navy.
With the exception of a first round sweep of San Antonio, the Los Angeles Lakers played seven-game series the rest of the way. During the run, they overcame the Utah Jazz in the semifinals, the Dallas Mavericks in the conference finals, and the Detroit Pistons in the NBA Finals. The Mavs' appearance in the conference finals was the team's first of four appearances.
 This was the first time that the season extended until the 21st of June, which meant that the entire NBA season covered all four seasons of the year, beginning with autumn in November during the regular season and lasting all the way to Game 7 of the Finals which was played on the first official day of summer.
On January 5, 1988, Hall of Famer Pete Maravich died of a heart attack during a pickup game. He was 40 years old. The Utah Jazz subsequently honored him by sporting a patch containing his jersey No. 7.
The Phoenix Suns mourned the loss of center Nick Vanos, killed in an airline crash on August 16, 1987. The Suns sported black circular patches with his jersey No. 30 on their uniforms for the season. 
The Detroit Pistons play  their final season at Pontiac Silverdome.
The Milwaukee Bucks play their final season at MECCA (Milwaukee Arena).
The Sacramento Kings play their final season at ARCO Arena I.
The Washington Bullets played the 1987–88 season with two players on opposite sides of the NBA height record: 7'7"  Manute Bol, then the league's tallest player (tied with another former Bullet, Gheorghe Mureșan) and 5'3" Muggsy Bogues, the league's shortest player.
CBS begins broadcasting the NBA games in stereo.
Larry Bird becomes the first player in NBA history to enter the 50–40–90 club more than once, and in consecutive seasons.

1987–88 NBA changes
 The Cleveland Cavaliers changed their road uniform from orange to dark blue color.
 The Washington Bullets changed their logo and uniforms.

Final standings

By division

By conference

Notes
z – Clinched home court advantage for the entire playoffs
c – Clinched home court advantage for the conference playoffs
y – Clinched division title 
x – Clinched playoff spot

Playoffs

Teams in bold advanced to the next round. The numbers to the left of each team indicate the team's seeding in its conference, and the numbers to the right indicate the number of games the team won in that round. The division champions are marked by an asterisk. Home court advantage does not necessarily belong to the higher-seeded team, but instead the team with the better regular season record; teams enjoying the home advantage are shown in italics.

Statistics leaders

NBA awards

Yearly awards
Most Valuable Player: Michael Jordan, Chicago Bulls
Rookie of the Year: Mark Jackson, New York Knicks
Defensive Player of the Year: Michael Jordan, Chicago Bulls
Sixth Man of the Year: Roy Tarpley, Dallas Mavericks
Most Improved Player: Kevin Duckworth, Portland Trail Blazers
Coach of the Year: Doug Moe, Denver Nuggets

All-NBA First Team:
F – Larry Bird, Boston Celtics
F – Charles Barkley, Philadelphia 76ers
C – Akeem Olajuwon, Houston Rockets
G – Michael Jordan, Chicago Bulls
G – Magic Johnson, Los Angeles Lakers

All-NBA Second Team:
F – Karl Malone, Utah Jazz
F – Dominique Wilkins, Atlanta Hawks
C – Patrick Ewing, New York Knicks
G – Clyde Drexler, Portland Trail Blazers
G – John Stockton, Utah Jazz

All-NBA Rookie Team:
Derrick McKey, Seattle SuperSonics
Cadillac Anderson, San Antonio Spurs
Mark Jackson, New York Knicks
Kenny Smith, Sacramento Kings
Armen Gilliam, Phoenix Suns

NBA All-Defensive First Team:
Kevin McHale, Boston Celtics
Rodney McCray, Houston Rockets
Akeem Olajuwon, Houston Rockets
Michael Cooper, Los Angeles Lakers
Michael Jordan, Chicago Bulls

NBA All-Defensive Second Team:
Buck Williams, New Jersey Nets
Karl Malone, Utah Jazz
Mark Eaton, Utah Jazz (tie)
Patrick Ewing, New York Knicks (tie)
Alvin Robertson, San Antonio Spurs
Lafayette Lever, Denver Nuggets

Player of the week
The following players were named NBA Player of the Week.

Player of the month
The following players were named NBA Player of the Month.

Rookie of the month
The following players were named NBA Rookie of the Month.

Coach of the month
The following coaches were named NBA Coach of the Month.

References

 
1987–88 in American basketball by league